Planetarium software is application software that allows a user to simulate the celestial sphere at any time of day, especially at night, on a computer. Such applications can be as rudimentary as displaying a star chart or sky map for a specific time and location, or as complex as rendering photorealistic views of the sky.

While some planetarium software is meant to be used exclusively on a personal computer, some applications can be used to interface with and control telescopes or planetarium projectors. Optional features may include inserting the orbital elements of comets and other newly discovered bodies for display.

Comparison of planetarium software

See also 
Space flight simulation game
List of space flight simulation games
List of observatory software

References

Educational software
Entertainment software
Astronomy software
Planetarium technology